Hypomania (literally "under mania" or "less than mania") is a mental and behavioral disorder, characterised essentially by an apparently non-contextual elevation of mood (euphoria) that contributes to persistently disinhibited behaviour.

The individual with the condition may experience irritability, not necessarily less severe than full mania; in fact, the presence of marked irritability is a documented feature of hypomanic and mixed episodes in bipolar type II. According to DSM-5 criteria, hypomania is distinct from mania in that there is no significant functional impairment; mania, by DSM-5 definition, does include significant functional impairment and may have psychotic features.

Characteristic behaviors of people experiencing hypomania are a notable decrease in the need for sleep, an overall increase in energy, unusual behaviors and actions, and a markedly distinctive increase in talkativeness and confidence, commonly exhibited with a flight of creative ideas. Other symptoms related to this may include feelings of grandiosity, distractibility, and hypersexuality. While hypomanic behavior often generates productivity and excitement, it can become troublesome if the subject engages in risky or otherwise inadvisable behaviors, and/or the symptoms manifest themselves in trouble with everyday life events. When manic episodes are separated into stages of a progression according to symptomatic severity and associated features, hypomania constitutes the first stage of the syndrome, wherein the cardinal features (euphoria or heightened irritability, pressure of speech and activity, increased energy, decreased need for sleep, and flight of ideas) are most plainly evident.

Signs and symptoms
Individuals in a hypomanic state have a decreased need for sleep, are extremely gregarious and competitive, and have a great deal of energy. They are, otherwise, often fully functioning (unlike individuals experiencing a manic episode).

Distinctive markers 
Specifically, hypomania is distinguished from mania by the absence of psychotic symptoms, and by its lesser degree of impact on functioning.

Hypomania is a feature of bipolar II disorder and cyclothymia, but can also occur in schizoaffective disorder. Hypomania is also a feature of bipolar I disorder; it arises in sequential procession as the mood disorder fluctuates between normal mood (euthymia) and mania. Some individuals with bipolar I disorder have hypomanic as well as manic episodes. Hypomania can also occur when moods progress downwards from a manic mood state to a normal mood. Hypomania is sometimes credited with increasing creativity and productive energy. Numerous people with bipolar disorder have credited hypomania with giving them an edge in their theater of work.

People who experience hyperthymia, or "chronic hypomania", encounter the same symptoms as hypomania but on a longer-term basis.

Associated disorders

Cyclothymia, a condition of continuous mood fluctuations, is characterized by oscillating experiences of hypomania and depression that fail to meet the diagnostic criteria for either manic or major depressive episodes. These periods are often interspersed with periods of relatively normal (euthymic) functioning.

When a patient presents with a history of at least one episode of both hypomania and major depression, each of which meet the diagnostic criteria, bipolar II disorder is diagnosed. In some cases, depressive episodes routinely occur during the fall or winter and hypomanic ones in the spring or summer. In such cases, one speaks of a "seasonal pattern".

If left untreated, and in those so predisposed, hypomania may transition into mania, which may be psychotic, in which case bipolar I disorder is the correct diagnosis.

Causes
Often in those who have experienced their first episode of hypomania – by definition without psychotic features – there may be a long or recent history of depression or a mix of hypomania combined with depression (known as mixed-state) prior to the emergence of manic symptoms. This commonly surfaces in the mid to late teens. Because the teenage years are typically an emotionally charged time of life, it is not unusual for mood swings to be passed off as normal hormonal teen behavior and for a diagnosis of bipolar disorder to be missed until there is evidence of an obvious manic or hypomanic phase.

In cases of drug-induced hypomanic episodes in unipolar depressives, the hypomania can almost invariably be eliminated by lowering medication dosage, withdrawing the drug entirely, or changing to a different medication if discontinuation of treatment is not possible.

Hypomania can be associated with narcissistic personality disorder.

Psychopathology
Mania and hypomania are usually studied together as components of bipolar disorders, and the pathophysiology is usually assumed to be the same. Given that norepinephrine and dopaminergic drugs are capable of triggering hypomania, theories relating to monoamine hyperactivity have been proposed. A theory unifying depression and mania in bipolar individuals proposes that decreased serotonergic regulation of other monoamines can result in either depressive or manic symptoms. Lesions on the right side frontal and temporal lobes have further been associated with mania.

Diagnosis

The DSM-IV-TR defines a hypomanic episode as including, over the course of at least four days, elevated mood plus three of the following symptoms OR irritable mood plus four of the following symptoms, when the behaviors are clearly different from how the person typically acts when not depressed:

 pressured speech
 inflated self-esteem or grandiosity
 decreased need for sleep
 flight of ideas or the subjective experience that thoughts are racing
 easily distracted
 increase in goal-directed activity (e.g., social activity, at work, or hypersexuality), or psychomotor agitation
 involvement in pleasurable activities that may have a high potential for negative psycho-social or physical consequences (e.g., the person engages in unrestrained buying sprees, sexual indiscretions, reckless driving, physical and verbal conflicts, foolish business investments, quitting a job to pursue some grandiose goal, etc.).

Treatment

Medications
Antimanic drugs are used to control acute attacks and prevent recurring episodes of hypomania combined with a range of psychological therapies. The recommended length of treatment ranges from two to five years. Anti-depressants may also be required for existing treatments but are avoided in patients who have had a recent history with hypomania. Sertraline has often been debated to have side effects that can trigger hypomania.

These include antipsychotics such as:
 Aripiprazole
 Clozapine
 Haloperidol
 Olanzapine
 Paliperidone
 Quetiapine
 Risperidone
 Ziprasidone

Other anti-manic drugs that are not antipsychotics include:
 Carbamazepine 
 Lithium
 Oxcarbazepine
 Valproate

Benzodiazepines such as clonazepam or lorazepam may be used to control agitation and excitement in the short-term.

Other drugs used to treat symptoms of mania/hypomania but considered less effective include:
 Gabapentin
 Lamotrigine
 Levetiracetam 
 Topiramate

Etymology
The Ancient Greek physicians Hippocrates and Aretaeus called one personality type 'manic' (Greek: μαινόμενοι, mainómenoi). In 19th century psychiatry, when mania had a broad meaning of insanity, hypomania was equated by some to concepts of 'partial insanity' or monomania. German neuro-psychiatrist Emanuel Ernst Mendel introduced hypomania ("hypo" meaning "under" in Greek) as a specific type of mania in 1881, writing, "I recommend, taking into consideration the word used by Hippocrates, to name those types of mania that show a less severe phenomenological picture, 'hypomania. Narrower operational definitions of hypomania were developed in the 1960s and 1970s.

See also

References

External links
 Hypomanic Episode – Bipolar Disorder

Bipolar disorder
Mania